Sultanul Kabir Chowdhury ( – 30 June 2014) was a Bangladeshi freedom fighter, lawyer and politician from Chittagong belonging to Bangladesh Awami League. He was a member of the Jatiya Sangsad.

Biography
Chowdhury was elected as the general secretary of Government City College, Chittagong in 1969. He took part in the mass uprising in 1969. He also took part in the Liberation War of Bangladesh in 1971.

Chowdhury was appointed as the president of Chittagong City Jubo League in 1972. He was arrested after the assassination of Sheikh Mujibur Rahman. He was released after six months.

Chowdhury was elected as a member of the Jatiya Sangsad from Chittagong-15 in 1991. He served as the acting president of Jubo League in 1999. He also served as the senior vice president of Chittagong South District unit of Awami League.
 
Chowdhury died of heart disease on 30 June 2014 at the age of 68.

References

People from Banshkhali Upazila
5th Jatiya Sangsad members
1940s births
2014 deaths
Awami League politicians
20th-century Bangladeshi lawyers
People of the Bangladesh Liberation War